Luis María Lagrutta (born April 28, 1988, in Rafaela, Santa Fe) is an Argentine footballer who currently plays for 9 de Julio de Rafaela in the Torneo Argentino B.

Honours
Atlético de Rafaela
Primera B Nacional (1): 2010–11

References

External links

1988 births
Living people
People from Rafaela
Sportspeople from Santa Fe Province
Argentine footballers
Atlético de Rafaela footballers
Argentine Primera División players
9 de Julio de Rafaela players
Association football midfielders